St. Malachy's Primary School may refer to:

St. Malachy's Primary School, Armagh, Armagh, Northern Ireland
St. Malachy's Primary School, Camlough, Camlough, County Armagh, Northern Ireland
St. Malachy's Primary School, Carnagat, Carnagat, County Armagh, Northern Ireland
St. Malachy's Primary School, Moneymore, Moneymore, County Londonderry, Northern Ireland
St. Malachy's Primary School, Seskilgreen, Seskilgreen, County Tyrone, Northern Ireland
St. Malachy's Primary School, Whitecross, Whitecross, County Armagh, Northern Ireland